WCDC (950 AM) is a radio station broadcasting a Christian radio format. Licensed to Moncks Corner, South Carolina, United States, it serves the Charleston, South Carolina area. The station is currently owned by The Moody Bible Institute of Chicago.

Programming
WCDC formerly aired the Clemson Tigers and NASCAR races when it was a sports talk and country formatted station.

History
On September 13, 2010, the then-WJKB changed from Dial Global classic country to sports talk. In March 2013, the station changed format to political talk. In December 2016, the station switched to a gospel format simulcasting WJNI. On July 30, 2019, the station switched to the Christian-formatted Moody Radio programming of new owner Moody Bible Institute.

External links
FCC History Cards for WCDC 
 Official Website

Radio stations established in 1963
1963 establishments in South Carolina
Moody Radio
CDC (AM)